In 2017, the Italian video game market posted a revenue of €1.8 billion. In 2018, Italy had 26.2 million players.

See also 

 Science and technology in Italy

References